The Metrobus is a  bus rapid transit route in Istanbul, Turkey. The system has 45 stations that follow the city's ring road via Avcılar, Zincirlikuyu and the Bosphorus Bridge to Söğütlüçeşme using dedicated bus lanes for almost the entire length of the route.

The busway, the first section of which opened in 2007 after two years of construction, is used by a number of Metrobus lines which operate within a ‘closed’ system carrying 1 million people daily. Turkish authorities have since assisted with the development of a similar system in Lahore, Pakistan, which opened in 2013. Its name was coined by the İETT to suggest that the system is a hybrid between a metro train and a bus.

The BRT corridor Avcılar - Söğütlüçeşme is certified to meet the BRT STANDARD with excellence: silver (2022)

History

Planning and construction
Construction of the first section of the busway, between Avcılar (serving Istanbul University's Avcılar campus) and Topkapı started in 2005.

Operation
The busway opened on September 17, 2007. It was then extended in an easterly direction from Topkapı to Zincirlikuyu, and then from Zincirlikuyu to Söğütlüçeşme, the latter of which is on the Anatolian side of Istanbul. In 2012, it was extended from Avcılar to a western residential suburb, Beylikdüzü.

Route

The system mainly follows the city's ringroad, with a fully separated right-of-way between Avcılar and Zincirlikuyu and between the eastern end of the Bosphorus Bridge and Söğütlüçeşme. There are no intersections with a dedicated bus lane in each direction with few passing lanes. Buses drive on the left-hand side of the bus lane, so that their doors, designed for conventional operation with door to the right-hand side of the vehicle, open onto the bidirectional central platforms. Most services operate only with the ‘closed’ BRT system.

The following table shows the interval between buses (headway) for each of three sections of the line for vehicles traveling in an easterly direction; intervals for buses in the other direction are similar. 

Times above shown as 'minutes:seconds'

Lines
There are six main services, each operating on different sub-sections of the route, and also the infrequent 34G, a 'night service', which operates over the full length for the busway.

Table showing the number of trips made by different lines using the busway

Proposed developments
At the eastern end, a new extension to Göztepe is planned.

Fleet

Controversy and criticism of Phileas buses

Reliability and safety
It has been suggested that Phileas buses, which are now rarely used, were underpowered and not strong enough to carry heavy passenger loads and climb steep hills typical of the topography of Istanbul. The hillclimbing aspect of this perception, though widely reported by the press, does not appear to have much evidential basis.

İETT's stated loading capacity (no. of people) for Phileas buses was considerably higher than that of the manufacturer. According to Phileas manufacturer APTS, the total capacity of the Phileas buses bought by İETT was 185 passengers. In comparison, former İETT president Mehmet Öztürk stated that the buses could safely operate with upwards of 280 passengers.

The single-lane Metrobus roads are frequently blocked by Phileas buses breaking down, causing delays for the all buses in a single direction. In May 2009, then-İETT president Mehmet Öztürk invited press members to "falsify untrue allegations against the Phileas brand buses". During the demonstration, another Phileas bus operating on the same lane broke down, thus blocking the route of the press bus for approximately five minutes. Öztürk later argued that the accident was the result of operator error. Also in 2009, İETT dismissed concerns regarding their institutional incompetence and the design of Phileas buses, citing "the very high loading at peak hours as the reason for malfunctioning rather than the road slope."

Phileas buses were designed with the capacity to use an electronic guided bus system. Öztürk pointed out that the guided bus system ensured that Phileas buses were safer than others, and that, even in the case of a front tire blowing out at speeds of up to 80 kilometers per hour, the vehicle would not crash. Despite his confidence in the safety of Phileas buses, one caught on fire in early 2015, further deepening concerns amongst the press and the Istanbulite public regarding their reliability and safety.

The manufacturers of the Phileas buses, APTS, were taken to court in 2010 by İETT over the failures. In 2017, CHP MP Gürsel Tekin stated that former Minister of the Interior Beşir Atalay, along with other members of the AKP cabinet, twice prevented the Istanbul Metropolitan Municipality (İBB) from initiating an investigation into the matter. An official investigation was launched by the government with the company.

Finances and corruption allegations 
The purchase of the Phileas buses was widely criticized in media as a waste of resources. In 2007, each Phileas bus cost 1.2 million Euros, and a total of 63 million Euros was paid by İETT to acquire 50 of them. In contrast, a Mercedes-Benz Capacity only cost 300 thousand Euros, and proved to be much more useful for the Metrobus. In 2008, civil service inspectors from the Ministry of the Interior uncovered 100 million Euros worth of irregular financial transactions in the İETT, chiefly relating to the purchase of the Phileas fleet. Their report to the Ministry, implicating high-ranking İETT officials including former president Mehmet Öztürk, indicated that the 63 million Euro purchase was made without a tender. By the request of the inspectors, a judicial investigation into İETT leadership was initiated by the Beyoğlu Office of the Chief Public Prosecutor, with Öztürk providing a written testimony.

Stations and route stopping patterns
Shaded boxes indicate route operates from the station.

 Routes
  34  (Avcılar - Zincirlikuyu)
  34A (Söğütlüçeşme - Cevizlibağ AÖY)
  34AS (Avcılar - Söğütlüçeşme)
  34BZ (Beylikdüzü - Zincirlikuyu)
  34C (Beylikdüzü - Cevizlibağ)
  34G (Beylikdüzü - Söğütlüçeşme) (Only Night)(G = Gece = Night)(22.00/06.00)
  34U (Uzunçayır - Zincirlikuyu)
  34Z (Zincirlikuyu - Söğütlüçeşme)

See also
 Public transport in Istanbul
 Istanbul nostalgic tramways
 Sabiha Gökçen airport
 Ferries in Istanbul
 Istanbul Airport
 Istanbul Metro
 Istanbul Tram
 Marmaray

Notes

References

External links 

 Metrobüs Forum 
 Metrobüs Schedule
 Beylikdüzü Metrobus Countdown

Transport in Istanbul
Bus rapid transit
2007 establishments in Turkey